Nequepio was a professional soccer team in El Salvador.

History
The club team originally played and was located on what is now Antiguo Cuscatlán, Cuscatlán. The name Nequepio is of indigenous origin, and was the name of the capital's department for many years, until the government changed the name to Cuscatlán. In 1926, Nequepio won the central region zone of the El Salvador, and played in the first ever national championship held by the Salvadoran Sports Commission. In the finals, Nequepio played Chinameca Sporting Club in Campo Marte, losing by a score of 2–1. This was the first and only national final appearance.

References

Nequepio